Uppländska is a variety of Svealand Swedish spoken in Uppland. Usage has declined in recent decades, but restoration attempts have been made by linguistic societies. It is primarily spoken in Uppland, Stockholm and in Åland.

References

Uppland
Swedish language
Swedish dialects